The Northwest Intercollegiate Athletic Association (NIAA), also known informally as the Northwest Conference, was a collegiate athletic conference in the Pacific Northwest of the United States, established in 1902. The conference ended football competition in 1914, but some sports, such as wrestling, continued through at least 1917.

History

Establishment

The Northwest Intercollegiate Athletic Association was established at a conference held in Spokane, Washington on October 11, 1902. Delegates from eight leading colleges of the Pacific Northwest region, including three university presidents, gathered in the directors' rooms of the Spokane Athletic Club and resolved to establish a new governing body for intercollegiate athletic competition. One of the schools present at the founding session, Pacific University, ultimately decided not to affiliate with the new group.

The University of Oregon was not represented by a delegate at the October 11 foundation meeting but voted to join in December 1902, bringing the total to eight institutions in the new federation.

The new body was designed to establish uniform eligibility rules for college athletics, to resolve such disputes as may emerge, and to schedule competitions between member schools in both athletics and debate. Thomas Franklin Kane, president of the University of Washington, was chosen as temporary chair of the new body, with mathematics professor J. E. Bonebright of the University of Idaho provisionally named as secretary. The gathering decided that governance should be through a board elected by the member institutions, with each school electing one member to the board — either a student, faculty member, or alumnus.

The Association took a strong position against professionalism, declaring that only bona fide students of true amateur status should be entitled to participate in intercollegiate competition. It was hoped that this would bring to an end the use of infiltrating skilled ringers into collegiate competition, a practice already recognized to be a bane upon college sports. Sports championships were to be arranged by the governing board.

Development and decline
At the NIAA's 1903 annual meeting, held in Moscow, Idaho on Saturday, June 6, J.E. Bonebright was elected president of the association for the coming year, with a new secretary tapped from Oregon Agricultural College. The 1903 conclave announced the scheduling of a massive regional track and field meet, to be held in Walla Walla, Washington on the campus of Whitman College, including participants from ten schools.

Sailing was not smooth for the new association, however. By the summer of 1905, the University of Oregon had left the Northwest Conference, with other members divided over the issue of whether athletes could earn tuition money playing baseball for pay during the summer months.

The Association seems to have attenuated in strength an influence, with the Spokane Chronicle observing in November 1905 that "there has been considerable talk about the Northwest Intercollegiate Association being a dead one, but the various college games this season would indicate that it is still very much alive..."

Reorganization
Despite protestations of its vitality, it is clear that by the end of 1907 the Northwest Intercollegiate Athletic Association had become moribund. In January 1908 officials at Whitman College called a conference of seven primary athletics-oriented universities in the region to reform a new intercollegiate athletics association. Each school was represented by two delegates at the Walla Walla conference — one representing the faculty and another representing the student body. The gathering was attended by six colleges — Idaho, Washington, Washington State, Oregon, Oregon Agricultural, and Whitman. A seventh institution, the University of Montana, was apparently invited to the reorganizational meeting but apparently did not attend.

At a two-day conference in Walla Walla, February 7–8, 1908, discussions on a broad range of topics were planned, including the eligibility of those participating in paid summer baseball, the development of a combined football schedule, and establishment of regional meets for track and field and debate. Rules for athletic participation including a one-year residence requirement and four year total of eligibility were also said to be promoted at the meeting by some participants.

The February 1908 conference in Walla Walla generated a binding set of rules for the six member schools for the 1908–09 and 1909–10 academic years. These included a four-year limit on athletic participation and a requirement that students transferring into member schools would not be eligible for athletic participation until they had been in attendance for one college year. The question of semi-professional summer baseball was to be left to the decision by athletic committees of each institution.

Rationalization of the football schedule was particularly desired, with the hope expressed that the newly rejuvenated conference would "either take control of, or in some way influence the arrangement of football schedules so that the northwest championship may be definitely decided each year, instead of leaving the schedule-making to a haphazard choice by individual managers." This aspiration was not to be achieved, however, and irregular scheduling among conference schools remained the norm until establishment of the Pacific Coast Conference in 1915.

Member institutions

See also
 Pacific Coast Conference

References

Defunct college sports conferences in the United States
College sports in Oregon